The 2018 Hawaii Senate elections took place as part of the biennial United States elections. Hawaii voters elected state senators in 13 of the state senate's 25 districts. State senators serve four-year terms in the Hawaii Senate.

A primary election on August 11, 2018 determined which candidates appear on the November 6 general election ballot. Primary election results can be obtained from the State of Hawaii's Office of Elections website. A statewide map of Hawaii's state Senate districts can be obtained from the state's Office of Planning here, and individual district maps can be obtained from the state's Office of Elections here.

Following the 2016 state senate elections, Democrats gained complete control of the Senate, with all 25 members.

To claim control of the chamber from Democrats, the Republicans needed to gain 13 senate seats; the Republicans only managed to gain one seat, but returned to having a presence in the chamber after being shut out in the 2016 elections.

Summary of results by Senate district
Districts not shown did not have an election until 2020.

Source:

Detailed Results by State Senate District

Source:

District 1

District 3

District 4

The state of Hawaii does not report vote totals for uncontested races. Incumbent Democrat Lorraine Inouye was re-elected without opposition in the general election.

District 6

District 7

The state of Hawaii does not report vote totals for uncontested races. Incumbent Democrat J. Kalani English was re-elected without opposition in the general election.

District 12

District 16
The state of Hawaii does not report vote totals for uncontested races. Incumbent Democrat Breene Harimoto was re-elected without opposition in the general election.

District 17

District 18

District 19

District 21

District 23

The state of Hawaii does not report vote totals for uncontested races. Incumbent Democrat Gil Riviere was re-elected without opposition in the general election.

District 24

The state of Hawaii does not report vote totals for uncontested races. Democrat Jarrett Keohokalole was elected without opposition in the general election.

See also
2018 United States elections
2018 United States Senate election in Hawaii
2018 United States House of Representatives elections in Hawaii
2018 Hawaii gubernatorial election
2018 Hawaii House of Representatives election

References

Senate
Hawaii Senate elections
Hawaii Senate